Nur-e-Alam Siddiqui is a Bangladesh Awami League politician and the former Member of Parliament of Jessore-2.

Career
Siddiqui was elected to parliament from Jessore-2 as a Bangladesh Awami League candidate in 1973. He was a leader of Sarbadaliya Chhatra Sangram Parishad. He is the Chairman of Doreen Group. He is the convener of Former Chatra League Members Foundation. He was previously the president of the foundation.

References

Awami League politicians
Living people
1st Jatiya Sangsad members
Year of birth missing (living people)